Hinduism is a minority religion in France, which is followed by more than 150,000 people in France. Most of the Hindus in France are mainly Sri Lankan Tamils (Tamils in France). Though there are many Hindus from India (Indian diaspora), Nepal, Afghanistan, Mauritius and other nations. 

It is the fifth largest in Europe, after those of the United Kingdom, Italy, The Netherlands and Germany.

Emergence of Hindus in France 
The initial presence of Hindus in France dates to the early 1700's and primarily consisted of sailors and servants, who eventually converted to Christianity. The Hindu population remained small until the opening of the Suez Canal in 1869, which reduced the travel time between India and Europe. Thereafter, as Indian dancers, musicians, and yogis began to migrate to France, the Hindu population slowly grew. From 1900 to 1920, a temporary Hindu temple was constructed, businessmen, students, and intellectuals began to migrate and settle in Paris, and France also became a destination for refugees fighting for Indian Independence.

Hindu immigration to France was catalyzed by Indian Independence in 1947. In 1971, Hindu Bengalis began to migrate to France. By 1975, nearly 60,000 Indians, 40% of which were Hindu, had migrated from Pondicherry to France. Mauritians also began to migrate to France for work and education after gaining independence. There are now approximately 60,000 Mauritians in France, primarily made up of Hindus and Muslims, and most of them settling in Paris.

The majority of Hindus in France are now Sri Lankan Tamils, whose population surged during the civil war in Sri Lanka as refugees sought asylum in the West. Most refugees aimed for refuge in Great Britain, but as Great Britain tightened their immigration policy, they eventually settled in France. For the same reason, Gujaratis, Pakistanis, and Bangladeshis, many of whom practiced Hinduism, settled in France.

Influence of Hinduism in France 
In 2022, Durga Puja was celebrated in 12 pavilions across France with various events including worship, offering of Anjali, distribution of prasad, and cultural programs.

Notable personality 
French people who were Hindus or were influenced by Hinduism include Victor Cousin, Alexandra David-Néel, Paul Gauguin, René Guénon, Jules Michelet, Mirra Richard, Romain Rolland, Satprem, Paul Verlaine, François Gautier and Voltaire.

Hinduism in French overseas territories

Hinduism in Martinique

Hinduism is followed in the Martinique by the Indo-Martiniquais. Though Indo-Martiniquais  comprises approximately 10% of the population of the island of Martinique, only a few are Hindus. Only 15% of Indo-Martiniquais are Hindus.

Hinduism in French Guiana

As of 2010, Hinduism is followed by 1.6% of the population of French Guiana. It is practiced mostly by the descendants of the Indo-Guyanese, who in 2014 numbered around 360,000.

Hinduism in Réunion

The French government gathers no statistics on religious affiliation. Because of this, it is impossible to know accurately how many Hindus there are in Réunion. Estimates of practicing Hindus vary from 6.7% to 10.7%. Most of the large towns have a functioning Hindu temple.
Yet, uncertainty as to the exact number of Hindus in the country results from the fact that many of the members of the Indian population cross-identify with Roman Catholic, Muslim and Hindu faiths.

About 59% of the Gujarati, 40% of the Punjabis, 10% of the Tamils in Réunion are Hindus. An interesting feature, likely peculiar to Réunion, is the simultaneous observance by some ethnic Indians of both Catholic and Hindu rites, a practice that has earned them the sobriquet of being "socially Catholic and privately Hindu."

Hinduism in Guadeloupe

Hinduism is practised by Some Indo-Guadeloupeans in Guadeloupe. According to a Statistics, Hinduism is followed by 0.5% of the Guadelopeans.

Notable French Hindus

 Vikash Dhorasoo, a member of the French Football World Cup squad in 2006. He is an ethnic Mauritian Indian from the town of Le Havre.
 Alain Danielou, a French historian, intellectual, musicologist, Indologist and noted Western convert to Shaivite Hinduism.
 Arnaud Desjardins, French journalist, film maker, main disciple of Swami Prajnanpad.
François Gautier, French journalist, settled in India and Western convert to Hinduism.
 Bapi Das Baul, Bengali folk musician, born in Kolkata and settled in France.
 Bollozzou Bassavalingam, Poet and writer, born in Yanam and settled in France.
 Jayasri Burman 
 Maya Burman
 Sakti Burman

Famous Hindu Temples  

 Sri Sathya Narayana Padhuga Temple,  6-8 Avenue Anatole France, 94600 Choisy-le-Roi, France
 Temple Ganesh, 17 Rue Pajol, 75018 Paris, France
 Radha Krishna Temple, 230 Avenue de la Division Leclerc, 95200 Sarcelles, France

See also 

 Hinduism by country
 Religion in France
 Demographics of France
 Indians in France
 Freedom of religion in France

References

Citations

Further sources

External links 

 

 
Hinduism by country
Hinduism in Europe
Religion in France